Lambert Feels Threatened (German: Lambert fühlt sich bedroht) is a 1949 Austrian mystery crime film directed by Géza von Cziffra and starring Hannelore Schroth, Curd Jürgens and Leopold Rudolf. The film was one of only a handful of crime films produced in the post-war era, with similarities to American and British film noirs. It was shot at the Schönbrunn Studios in Vienna and on location around Pörtschach am Wörthersee. The film's sets were designed by the art director Fritz Jüptner-Jonstorff. It was given a West German release in September 1951.

Synopsis
Lambert a reclusive man lives in isolated house in an island in the middle of a lake. He is obsessed with the idea that somebody wants to kill him and appeals for police protection. Inspector Roland takes over the case and arrives on the fog-bound island, and soon encounters strange happenings and the death of the local doctor.

Cast
 Hannelore Schroth as 	Maria
 Curd Jürgens as 	Roland
 Leopold Rudolf as 	Lambert
 Paul Kemp as 	Bobby
 Hermann Erhardt as Billert
 Julius Brandt as 	Arzt
 Erni Mangold	
 Josef Zechell	
 Carl Falkner	
 Walter Sudra	
 Teddy Kern

References

Bibliography 
 Fritsche, Maria. Homemade Men in Postwar Austrian Cinema: Nationhood, Genre and Masculinity. Berghahn Books, 2013.

External links 
 

1949 films
Austrian crime films
1949 crime films
Austrian mystery films
1949 mystery films
1940s German-language films
Films directed by Géza von Cziffra
Austrian black-and-white films
Films shot at Schönbrunn Studios
Sascha-Film films